Yongle Emperor's campaigns against the Mongols (1410–1424), also known as Emperor Chengzu's Northern (Mobei) Campaigns, or the Yongle's Northern Expeditions, was a military campaign of the Ming dynasty under the Yongle Emperor against the Northern Yuan. During his reign he launched several aggressive campaigns, defeating the Northern Yuan, Eastern Mongols, Oirats, and various other Mongol tribes.

Background
During the reign of the Hongwu Emperor, the Mongol commander Naghachu surrendered to the Ming in 1387 and Tögüs Temür of the Northern Yuan was defeated by Ming armies under General Lan Yu in 1388. The many Mongol tribes of Manchuria surrendered to the Ming dynasty, who incorporated them into the Uriyangkhad commanderies (known as the "Three commandaries") to serve at the empire's northern frontier regions. However, the Oirat Mongols and Eastern Mongols remained hostile towards the Ming.

The Ming court had dispatched the ambassador Guo Ji to the Eastern Mongols, demanding that they submit as a tributary to the Ming dynasty. However, in 1409, Öljei Temür Khan, ruler of the Northern Yuan, executed the ambassador from the Ming dynasty. By contrast, Mahmud of the Oirat Mongols had sent a tributary mission to the imperial Ming court in 1408. 

By establishing relations with the Oirat, the Ming effectively used them to offset the Eastern Mongols. There was growing enmity amongst the Ming court towards the Eastern Mongols for their refusal to accept tributary status and for the killing of a Ming emissary. Between 1410 and 1424, the Yongle Emperor led five military campaigns against the Mongols.

Course

First campaign
In the winter of 1409, the Yongle Emperor made preparations for his military expedition. On 25 March 1410, he departed from Beijing on his military expedition against the Eastern Mongols. He brought with him an estimated 100,000 soldiers, even though the History of Ming gives an unlikely figure of 500,000 troops. They made use of 30,000 carts for transport. They traveled respectively to Xuanfu, Xinghe, and Kerulen.

The armies, advancing from Xinghe, stopped at Minluanshu, because the Yongle Emperor held a large military parade before the Oirat Mongol envoys. At the northern shores of Kerulen, he had carved into the rocks "Eighth year of the Yongle Geng Yin (ganzhi year), fourth month Ding You (ganzhi month), sixteenth day Ren Zi [May 19, 1410], the Emperor of the Great Ming passed here with six armies during the punitive expedition against the barbarian robbers."

Bunyashiri wanted to flee from the advancing Ming armies, but Arughtai disagreed with him. Therefore, the two Mongol leaders and their forces each separated to a different direction. The Ming armies first gave chase to Bunyashiri. On 15 June 1410, they annihilated Bunyashiri's forces at the Onon River, but Bunyashiri managed to escape from the Ming armies. Afterwards, the Ming army pursued Arughtai and his Mongol forces. They found and defeated his forces at Qingluzhen near Taor River, but he fled with his remaining men. The Yongle Emperor returned to Beijing on 15 September 1410.

Arughtai, after his defeat, attempted to establish a fragile relationship with the Ming dynasty, because he feared Ming's military power and desired Ming goods through trade. Surrendering as a tributary to the Ming, an alliance was established between Arughtai and the Ming court. Late 1410, Arughtai sent tribute horses to the Ming imperial court and received trading privileges. In the spring of 1412, Mahmud's Oirat Mongols found and killed Bunyashiri during his flight from the Ming armies.

Second campaign
The Ming court's attitude became more disdainful and negative towards the Oirats. The Yongle Emperor denied the Oirats chieftain Mahmud's request for the bestowal of rewards to his followers who had fought against Bunyashiri and Arughtai. Mahmud soon became angered by the Ming court's disregard towards him. He imprisoned Ming envoys, so the Yongle Emperor sent the eunuch envoy Hai T'ung in an unsuccessful attempt to secure their release.

In 1413, feeling threatened, Mahmud of the Oirat had dispatched 30,000 Mongol troops to Kerulen River against the Ming dynasty. Late 1413, Arughtai informed the Ming court that Mahmud of the Oirats had crossed the Kerulen River, which would prove to trigger an imminent war with the Ming. 

On 6 April 1414, the Yongle Emperor departed from Beijing to lead a military campaign against the Oirat Mongols. The Ming advanced via Xinghe to Kerulen, to meet the Oirats in battle at the upper Tula River. The battle between the Ming army and Oirat ensued between the upper courses of the Tula and Kerulen rivers. The Oirat Mongols were overwhelmed by the heavy bombardment of the Ming cannons. They were greatly reduced and were forced to retreat. Mahmud and Delbek (a puppet khan) fled from the Ming armies. The Yongle Emperor returned to Beijing in August 1414.

Arughtai had so-called excused himself from battle on the claim that he was allegedly unable to join due to illness. Even though Mahmud sought out reconciliation with the Ming, the Yongle Emperor looked to the thought with much suspicion. In any regard, before anything could happen, Arughtai had attacked and killed Mahmud and Delbek in 1416.

Third campaign

Arughtai hoped to gain rewards from the Ming court for his services against the Oirats. However, the Ming court bestowed only titles onto Arughtai and his mother, but did not give him the commercial privileges that he wanted. Arughtai became increasingly hostile and began attacking caravans at the northern trade routes to the Ming dynasty. By 1421, he had stopped sending tribute to the Ming. In 1422, he attacked and overran the frontier fortress Xinghe. This would prompt the Ming into launching a third military campaign.

Many senior officials opposed the expedition and urged the emperor against launching it, because they found that it placed too great of an expense to the empire's treasury, but the emperor rejected his officials' words of advice. Eventually, resulting from their opposition, Minister of War Fang Bin committed suicide, while Minister of Revenue Xia Yuanji and Minister of Works Wu Zhong were imprisoned.

On 12 April 1422, the Yongle Emperor and his armies left Beijing towards Kulun. The Ming army supposedly comprised 235,000 soldiers according to Rossabi (1998). They had 235,146 men, 340,000 donkeys, 117,573 carts, and 370,000 shi of grain according to Perdue (2005). The Yongle Emperor led his armies towards Dolon, where Arughtai was encamped. A force of 20,000 troops was detached and sent to the Uriankhai commanderies—which had fallen to Arughtai—recapturing it in July. 

The Ming armies struck fear into Arughtai, who avoided engagement by fleeing far into the steppe. The Ming armies responded with the destruction and plundering of his encampments. The frustrating and unedifying situation caused the Yongle Emperor to shift his attention to mercilessly attacking and plundering three Uriankhai Mongol tribes who were not involved with Arughtai's hostilities. The plunders and attacks against any Mongols who found themselves in the path of the Ming armies would be repeated in following campaigns. The Ming armies returned to Beijing on 23 September.

Fourth campaign
In 1423, the Yongle Emperor launched a preemptive strike against Arughtai's Mongol forces. Leaving from Beijing in August, the Ming armies traveled through Xinghe and Wanquan. However, Arughtai withdrew and fled from the advancing Ming army once again. Esen Tügel, an Eastern Mongol commander, surrendered to the Ming. The Ming armies returned to Beijing in December 1423.

Fifth campaign
Arughtai continued raiding the northern frontier at Kaiping and Datong. In 1424, the Yongle Emperor responded by launching his fifth campaign. He gathered his armies at Beijing and Xuanfu. In early April, he departed from Beijing towards Arughtai's forces. They marched through Tumu and north to Kaiping. Once again, Arughtai avoided engagement by fleeing from the Ming army. Some of the Ming commanders wanted to pursue Arughtai's Mongol forces, but the Yongle Emperor felt that he had overextended himself and pulled back his armies. On 12 August 1424, the emperor perished during the return to the Ming.

See also
 Ming campaign against the Uriankhai
 Battle of Buir Lake
 Battle of Kherlen

References

Literature 

 
 

 

Wars involving the Ming dynasty
Wars involving the Northern Yuan dynasty
Yongle Emperor
History of Zhangjiakou